Patriarch Cyril (secular name Konstantin Markov Konstantinov, ; January 3, 1901 – March 7, 1971), was the first Patriarch of the restored Bulgarian Patriarchate.

Born in Sofia, Bulgaria to a family of Aromanian descent, he adopted his religious name of Cyril in the St. Nedelya Church on December 30, 1923 and became Metropolitan of Plovdiv in 1938.

On May 10, 1953 Cyril was elected Patriarch of Bulgaria, holding the position until his death.

Cyril was buried in the main church of the Bachkovo Monastery, 89 kilometres from Sofia.

Cyril's historical role in the Bulgarian popular resistance to the Holocaust is recounted in the oratorio "A Melancholy Beauty", composed by Georgi Andreev with libretto by Scott Cairns and Aryeh Finklestein, first performed in June 2011 in Washington, D.C. The text describes "Metropolitan Kyril" in 1943 confronting the captors of Bulgarian Jews slated to be deported. Kyril first pledges to go with the deportees in solidarity and then tells the guards he will block the train with his own body. The guards reply that they have just received new orders to release the Jews.

1901 births
1971 deaths
Clergy from Sofia
Eastern Orthodox Righteous Among the Nations
Bulgarian Righteous Among the Nations
Patriarchs of Bulgaria
Bulgarian people of Aromanian descent